In 1855, Catalan workers went on strike following the dubious trial and execution of labor leader . It was the first general strike in Spanish history. A factory director was killed in Sants during the strike. As labor unions expanded in the next century, strikes became commonplace in Barcelona.

Context
The strike took place during the Baldomero Espartero government of the Bienio progresista during the reign of Isabella II which began with the revolution of 1854 which included the proclamation of June 28, 1854 and the coup lead by Leopoldo O'Donnell, with the support of France and Britain.

Origin

Workers initially mobilized against mechanization, specifically in relation to the spinning of yarn.

Due to new freedoms acquired after the Revolution of 1854 and the tolerance of the Espartero government, workers' associations were developed, with thirty associations forming a central council. But the newly appointed captain general of Catalonia, General Zapatero, put an end to tolerance and began a policy of repression of the labor movement.

References

Further reading

 

General strike
1855 labor disputes and strikes
General strikes in Spain
Protests in Catalonia